Blue Fang Games was an American video game developer, most noted for its Zoo Tycoon. The company closed down in 2011, after their contract with Microsoft ended.

Games

Awards

References

 
Video game development companies
Zoo Tycoon
Defunct companies based in Massachusetts
Video game companies established in 1998
Video game companies disestablished in 2011
Defunct video game companies of the United States